Raišiai is a village in Vilnius District Municipality, Lithuania. According to the 2011 census, it had population of 11. It is located in the south coast of Salotė Lake, close to the Girulių Forest and 1 kilometer from Pilaitė.

In 2021 a treasure was discovered in Raišiai with 40 Grand Duke Jogaila's coins (Denars), some of which are with lions while others are with horsemen wielding swords or spears, most of these coins were minted in 1377–1386 (prior to crowning of Jogaila as the Polish King).

References

Villages in Vilnius County
Vilnius District Municipality